Nicolas-René Jollain  (1732 – 1804) was a French painter. He was a student of Jean-Baptiste Marie Pierre at the Académie royale de peinture et de sculpture.

Work

References

Further reading
 French Oil Sketches and the Academic Tradition. 1994. pp. 69–70.

1732 births
1804 deaths
18th-century French painters
French draughtsmen
French history painters
French male painters
Members of the Académie royale de peinture et de sculpture
Mythological painters
Painters from Paris
Religious painters
Date of birth unknown
Date of death unknown
18th-century French male artists